Zachary Jonathan Pagett Sudfeld (born April 17, 1989) is a former American football tight end. He was signed by the New England Patriots as an undrafted free agent in 2013. He played college football at Nevada.

Early years
Sudfeld attended Modesto Christian High School in Modesto, California. Sudfeld was named to the first-team all-state as a tight end. He also earned the first-team all-district and all-league honors in high school. His younger brother, Nate, is a quarterback for the Detroit Lions.

Professional career

New England Patriots
On May 3, 2013, Sudfeld signed with the New England Patriots. Sudfeld's size and catching ability led at least one Patriots reporter to call Sudfeld a "baby Gronk," referring to New England Patriots tight end Rob Gronkowski. During the Patriots' second preseason game, against the Tampa Bay Buccaneers, Sudfeld scored on a two-point conversion from Tom Brady and on a 22-yard touchdown from Ryan Mallett. On October 3, 2013, Sudfeld was released from the Patriots, after lackluster performances, where Sudfeld made no receptions.

New York Jets
Sudfeld was claimed off waivers by the New York Jets on October 4, 2013. He caught 5 passes for 63 yards on the season. Sudfeld suffered an anterior cruciate ligament injury in minicamp and was waived on June 15, 2015. He cleared waivers a day later and was placed on the injured reserve list. On September 3, 2016, Sudfeld was released by the Jets as part of final roster cuts.

Personal life
Sudfeld has a twin brother named Matt, who is director of strategic development of a humanitarian organization that was started by his grandparents. He also has two sisters: Juliana, who played volleyball for Wheaton College in Illinois, and Sarah, who played basketball for The King's College in New York City. His younger brother  Nate is a quarterback for the Detroit Lions.

References

External links
Nevada Wolf Pack bio
New York Jets bio

1989 births
Living people
American football tight ends
Sportspeople from Santa Cruz, California
Nevada Wolf Pack football players
New England Patriots players
New York Jets players
Modesto Christian School alumni